William Gibbs may refer to:

People
William Gibbs (Australian politician) (1879–1944), Australian Senator 
William Gibbs (businessman) (1790–1875), English businessman who developed Tyntesfield 
William Gibbs (New Zealand politician) (1817–1897), New Zealand MP
William Gibbs (schoolboy) (1865–1877), British boy who committed suicide, causing a government inquiry
William C. Gibbs (1789–1871), Governor of Rhode Island from 1821 to 1824
William D. Gibbs (1869–1944), president of what became the University of New Hampshire, USA
William Edward Gibbs (1890–1934), British chemical engineer
William Francis Gibbs (1886–1967), American naval architect
William F. Gibbs (1895–1987), American businessman, politician, and farmer
William Henry Gibbs (1823–1902), Canadian politician

Other uses
William Gibbs School for Girls, Faversham, Kent, England
William Gibbs House, a historic house in Waltham, Massachusetts, USA

See also

Gibbs (surname)

William Gibbs McAdoo, U.S. senator from California
 William Gibbs McAdoo House, Marietta, Georgia, USA
William Gibbes (disambiguation)
William Gibb (disambiguation)
William (disambiguation)
Gibbs (disambiguation)